Kevin Dewayne Brown (born March 5, 1966) is a former Major League Baseball pitcher who pitched in the majors for parts of three seasons,  to . He finished his major league career with a 4.82 earned run average in 89 innings. He is now a high school varsity baseball coach.

Brown signed with the Atlanta Braves in 1986, and was traded to the New York Mets the following year. After pitching for the Mets for part of the 1990 season, he was traded to the Milwaukee Brewers. Following the 1991 season, he was waived by the Brewers and was claimed by the Seattle Mariners, where he pitched his final season in 1992.

References

External links

1966 births
Living people
Major League Baseball pitchers
Baseball players from California
New York Mets players
Milwaukee Brewers players
Seattle Mariners players
Sportspeople from Oroville, California